Intensity of preference, also known as intensity preference,  is a term popularized by the work of the economist Kenneth Arrow, who was a co-recipient of the 1972 Nobel Memorial Prize in Economics.   This term is used in reference to models for aggregating ordinal rankings.

This term is used in economics, politics, marketing, management science and other areas in which methods to derive the consensus ranking are developed.

In an analysis of voting, for example, the intensity of preference is a measure of an individual voter's (or group of voters') willingness to incur the costs or inconvenience of the act of officially registering a preferential choice at the time and place required, not the vote itself.

Social choices
The "intensity" of preference can be a factor in aggregating individual choices into social choices.
Independence of irrelevant alternatives "... does not rule out "intensity" of preference in making social choices.
(1) "It is part of our definition of a social choice rule/function that the choices are based only on the information in a profile of ordinal preference relations.
(2) "These preference relations do not contain any intensity information that could be used by social choice rules, whether or not they violate the independence axiom."

See also
 Arrow's impossibility theorem
 Majority rule
 Storable voting

Notes

References
 Arrow, Kenneth J. (1951).  Social Choice and Individual Values. New York: John Wiley.  OCLC 469063398  
 Kelly, Jerry S. (1987). Social Choice Theory: An Introduction. Berlin : Springer-Verlag. ;  OCLC 475917883

External links
  Intensity Measures of Consumer Preferences

Economics theorems
Voting theory
Social choice theory